Bracken Cave is the summer home to the largest colony of bats in the world. An estimated 20 million Mexican free-tailed bats roost in the cave from March to October making it the largest known concentration of mammals. The cave is located in southern Comal County, Texas, outside the city of San Antonio. The -wide crescent shaped opening to the cave lies at the bottom of a sinkhole, formed when the roof of the cave collapsed.

The cave and undeveloped  around it are owned by Austin, Texas-based Bat Conservation International, which restores the land to support native vegetation and an abundant variety of wildlife. Bat Conservation International bought the initial  from the Marbach family in 1992, and has been assisted in preservation efforts by The Nature Conservancy. Access to the cave is restricted to protect the habitat of the resident bats. Bat Conservation International offers evening guided tours to the cave to watch the bats emerge from the cave.

In media
Bracken Cave has been featured in the media several times since its discovery. The National Geographic Wild channel included Bracken Cave in the World's Weirdest series episode "Freaks of the Sky." It was also featured in the first pilot episode of Dirty Jobs.

Bat haven
The Bracken Cave is the destination every March or April of over 20,000,000 Mexican free-tailed bats (Tadarida brasiliensis). After arriving in the cave, the migrant mothers give birth to pups. The city of San Antonio, a local developer, and conservation groups reached agreement on "a $20 million deal" in 2014, to ensure that human development would not encroach on the bats, and that the sky near their cave would remain dark at night.

Farming benefits
From March to October, the bats at Bracken Cave emerge between 6 and 8 p.m. flying southeast on a collision course with bugs such as cotton bollworth moths and army cut-worm moths being pushed away from crops southwest by winds.

The bats consume several tons of insects per night, which according to research conducted in 2006, saves cotton farmers in south central Texas about  a year.

Unknown bat count
While the Bracken Cave bat roost is often estimated at 20 million, the true number of bats is unknown due to unreliable counting methods.

References

External links

 Bracken Bat Cave at Bat Conservation International

See also 

 Ann W. Richards Congress Avenue Bridge#Bats

Caves of Texas
Limestone caves
Wild caves
Nature reserves in Texas
Protected areas of Comal County, Texas
Tadarida
Landforms of Comal County, Texas
Texas Hill Country